Antolin is the Basque form of the masculine given name Antonio in use in the Basque Country. Notable people with this name include the following:

Given name
Saint Antoninus of Pamiers, known as San Antolín in Spanish 
 Antolín Alcaraz (born 1982), Paraguayan footballer
 Antolín García (1928–1990), Spanish radio and television presenter
 Antolín Monescillo y Viso (1811–1897), Spanish cardinal 
 Antolin Oreta (born 1971), Filipino politician
 Antolín Ortega (born 1951), Spanish footballer
 Antolín Sánchez (born 1955), Spanish politician

Middle name
 José Antolin Toledano (born 1936), Spanish industrialist

Surname
Daniel Raba Antolín, known as Dani Raba (born 1995), Spanish footballer
 Dustin Antolin (born 1989), American baseball player
 Enriqueta Antolín (1941–2013), Spanish writer
Francisco Sedano Antolín, known as Paco Sedano (born 1979), Spanish futsal player
 Jeanette Antolin (born 1981), American gymnast
 Keola Antolin (born 1990), American-born Canadian football player

See also

Antonin (name)
Antoin

Notes

Basque masculine given names